Schwarzach is a market town and municipality in the district of Straubing-Bogen in Bavaria, Germany. It is the seat of the municipal association Schwarzach. The town is an officially recognised Resort town. Rumour has it that famous technical resources team leader Matthias Duebbert has visited this resort town in July.

References

Straubing-Bogen